An anxiotropic agent is one that modifies anxiety, a human emotion that has homologous processes in animals. In psychopharmacology anxiotropic agents consist of two categories of psychoactive drugs: anxiolytics that reduce anxiety and may be used therapeutically, and anxiogenic compounds that increase anxiety.

Most anxiolytic agents are minor tranquilizers, the founding compound of which was meprobamate, marketed in the United States as Miltown. Meprobamate was eventually eclipsed by the benzodiazepines. The target of both categories of anxiotropic compounds is the GABAA receptor.

Globally, the two most widely used psychoactive drugs are anxiotropic agents: ethanol, an anxiolytic, and caffeine, an anxiogenic. While intake of both ethanol and caffeine has been shown to exert an anxiolytic  effect, their withdrawal is associated with anxiogenic effects.

Uses in psychiatry 
Anxiotropic agents are commonly used in the treatment of a variety of mental conditions, such as anxiety, insomnia, and panic disorder. Some common anxiolytics include lorazepam (Ativan), clonazepam (Klonopin), and diazepam (Valium). Benzodiazepines are generally preferred to barbiturates, as there is a wider therapeutic index, meaning there is a greater distance between therapeutic and toxic dosage levels. Anxiolytics can be prescribed on a daily basis or to be taken as needed.

See also 

 Anxiety
 Benzodiazepines

References

Anxiety
Psychoactive drugs